Diacetone alcohol is an organic compound with the formula CH3C(O)CH2C(OH)(CH3)2, sometimes called DAA.  This colorless liquid is a common synthetic intermediate used for the preparation of other compounds, and is also used as a solvent.

Synthesis and reactions

First identified by Heintz, one standard laboratory preparation of DAA entails the Ba(OH)2-catalyzed condensation of two molecules of acetone.

It undergoes dehydration to give the α,β-unsaturated ketone called mesityl oxide. Hydrogenation of diacetone alcohol  gives hexylene glycol. Condensation with urea give "diacetone-monourea", i.e. the heterocycle 3,4-dihydro-
4,4,6-trimethyl-2(1H)-pyrimidone.

Uses
Diacetone alcohol is used in cellulose ester lacquers, particularly of the brushing type, where it produces brilliant gloss and hard film and where its lack of odor is desirable. It is used in lacquer thinners, dopes, wood stains, wood preservatives and printing pastes; in coating compositions for paper and textiles; permanent markers; in making artificial silk and leather; in imitation gold leaf; in celluloid cements; as a preservative for animal tissue; in metal cleaning compounds; in the manufacture of photographic film; and in hydraulic brake fluids, where it is usually mixed with an equal volume of castor oil.

Safety
The  (oral, rats) is 4 g/kg.

References

Tertiary alcohols
Aldols